Rear Window is a 1998 American made-for-television crime-drama thriller film directed by Jeff Bleckner. The teleplay by Larry Gross and Eric Overmyer is an updated adaptation of the classic 1954  film of the same name directed by Alfred Hitchcock which was based on the short story "It Had to Be Murder" by Cornell Woolrich. It was broadcast in the United States by ABC on November 22, 1998. This stars Christopher Reeve (in one of his final screen appearances), Daryl Hannah, and Robert Forster.

Synopsis
Quadriplegic Jason Kemp, a former architect who now uses a wheelchair, relieves the boredom of his daily existence by engaging in voyeurism, a pastime that allows him to spy on his neighbors from the rear window of his apartment. When he witnesses sculptor Julian Thorpe viciously beat his wife Ilene, he reports the incident to 911 and the police remove him from his home. Thorpe is released the following day, and that night Jason Kemp hears a blood-curdling scream from the courtyard. From that moment on, Ilene is missing from her apartment, apparently replaced by another woman. Jason, certain she was murdered by her husband, tries to convince his colleague Claudia, nurse Antonio, and friend Charlie that his suspicion is true. Thorpe slowly comes to the realization that Kemp is fully aware of his crime, and engages him in a deadly game of cat and mouse in an effort to silence him forever.

Cast

Production

Casting
The role of Jason Kemp was the first film for Christopher Reeve following the 1995 Memorial Day fall from horseback riding that left him paralyzed. Scenes detailing his character's rehabilitation were based on his own physical therapy experiences. On the set the actor reached a personal milestone: speaking without being plugged into his ventilator for the first time.

Filming
Rear Window was filmed on location in New York City, at the Burke Rehabilitation Center (where Reeve was being treated) in White Plains, New York, and in two converted Otis Elevator warehouses in Yonkers. Scenes were also shot at the New Jersey Performing Arts Center in Newark.

Reception

Critical response
In his review in Entertainment Weekly, Ken Tucker said, "Reeve's real-life tragedy lends true fear to the scene in which the bad guy cuts off Jason's air-supply tube. But the problem here isn't Reeve's performance so much as it is the slack, awkwardly updated, and frequently confusing teleplay by Eric Overmyer and Larry Gross. The production also could have used a supporting character with the vim and vinegar of the original's Thelma Ritter."

The review aggregator website Rotten Tomatoes reported that 36% of critics have given the film a positive review based on 11 reviews, with an average rating of 5.04/10.

Accolades

See also
 List of television films produced for American Broadcasting Company

References

External links
 
 
 

1998 television films
1998 films
1998 crime thriller films
1990s mystery films
Remakes of American films
American mystery films
American thriller television films
Crime television films
Films about paraplegics or quadriplegics
Films about security and surveillance
Films set in apartment buildings
Films shot in New York (state)
Films shot in New Jersey
Films based on works by Cornell Woolrich
Films directed by Jeff Bleckner
Films scored by David Shire
1990s English-language films
1990s American films